Bedeliolus is a genus of ground beetles in the family Carabidae. There are at least three described species in Bedeliolus.

Species
These three species belong to the genus Bedeliolus:
 Bedeliolus freyellus Jedlicka, 1959  (Arab Emirates and Iran)
 Bedeliolus konevi Kryzhanovskij, 1990  (Kazakhstan)
 Bedeliolus vigil Semenov, 1900  (Iran and Turkmenistan)

References

Trechinae